Yang Yun (born March 2, 1984) is a Chinese gymnast. She was born in Zhuzhou, Hunan. She won the bronze medal on the uneven bars at the 2000 Summer Olympics along with a fifth-place finish in the all around, where a fall off the balance beam (a five tenth deduction) cost her the gold medal, finishing less than three and a half tenths behind eventual champion Simona Amânar of Romania. She was also a member of the bronze medal winning Chinese team, but the medal was stripped by the IOC in 2010 after one of the Chinese team members was found to be underage during the competition.

Yang Yun became a CCTV reporter. She is married to Chinese gymnast Yang Wei.

Age controversy
After Yang Yun admitted to being 14 when she competed in Sydney on Chinese national television, she was subject to an investigation by the International Gymnastics Federation along with teammate Dong Fangxiao. Yang Yun was found to be innocent due to insufficient evidence in February 2010, meaning she was able to keep her bronze medal in uneven bars, but she was given a warning by the FIG. Her teammate Dong Fangxiao was found guilty and her results were canceled. On April 28, 2010, the IOC removed the Chinese team's bronze medal.

References

External links
 
 

1984 births
Living people
Chinese female artistic gymnasts
Gymnasts at the 2000 Summer Olympics
Olympic gymnasts of China
Olympic bronze medalists for China
People from Zhuzhou
Olympic medalists in gymnastics
Competitors stripped of Summer Olympics medals
Gymnasts from Hunan
Medalists at the 2000 Summer Olympics